Adalwara Kalan is an Indian village located at Sawai Madhopur, Rajasthan.

Demography 
As of census 2011, Village has population 1914. In which 979 are males and 935 are females.

References 

Villages in Sawai Madhopur district